The 1930 Swedish Ice Hockey Championship was the ninth season of the Swedish Ice Hockey Championship, the national championship of Sweden. IK Gota won the championship.

Tournament

Qualification 
 UoIF Matteuspojkarna - IK Hermes 4:0

Quarterfinal 
 Södertälje SK - Nacka SK 2:0
 AIK - Karlbergs BK 7:0
 IK Göta - Hammarby IF 3:0
 Djurgårdens IF - UoIF Matteuspojkarna 3:1

Semifinals 
 Södertälje SK - AIK 2:3
 IK Göta - Djurgårdens IF 3:1

Final 
 AIK - IK Göta 0:2

External links
 Season on hockeyarchives.info

Cham
Swedish Ice Hockey Championship seasons